Hymenobacter saemangeumensis  is a Gram-negative, extremely halophilic and non-motile bacterium from the genus of Hymenobacter which has been isolated from a salt mine in Wensu County in China.

References

External links
Type strain of Hymenobacter saemangeumensis at BacDive -  the Bacterial Diversity Metadatabase

saemangeumensis
Halophiles
Bacteria described in 2013